Apparent infection rate is an estimate of the rate of progress of a disease, based on proportional measures of the extent of infection at different times.

Firstly, a proportional measure of the extent of infection is chosen as the disease extent metric. For example, the metric might be the proportion of leaf area affected by mildew, or the proportion of plants in a population showing dieback lesions. Measures of disease extent are then taken over time, and a mathematical model is fit. The model is based upon two assumptions:
 the progress of the infection is constrained by the amount of tissue that remains to be infected; and
 if it were not so constrained, the extent of infection would exhibit exponential growth.

There is a single model parameter r, which is the apparent infection rate. It can be calculated analytically using the formula

where
r is the apparent infection rate
t1 is the time of the first measurement
t2 is the time of the second measurement
x1 is the proportion of infection measured at time t1
x2 is the proportion of infection measured at time t2

See also 

 Odds ratio

References
 

Epidemiology
Mathematical modeling